Dhutiguda is a small village in Borigumma block of Koraput district, Odisha. Most of the people are farmers, daily wagers and very less government employees.

Location 
It is located 10 km away from Borigumma town. It comes under the Benasur Panchayat Samiti. Mainly, pentia community lives here.

Villages in Koraput district